DMZ Train (aka Peace Train) ) is a South Korean excursion train operated by Korail.  The train began operations in 2014 and transports tourists from Seoul to train terminals closest to the Korean Demilitarized Zone.

Overview
The first train opened on May 4, 2014, and travels on the Gyeongui Line, in South Korea's northwest, running from Seoul Station to Dorasan station. The train crosses the Imjingang Railroad Bridge on the Imjin River and arrives in Paju, Gyeonggi close to the DMZ. At the Imjingang station passengers must debark for an identification check and head count because Dorasan is the only train station located within the civilian-restricted area.

The DMZ train ended a four-year break of passenger service to Dorasan station, started in April 2002 under the Sunshine Policy, and suspended by the Ministry of National Defense in 2010 after a person attempted crossing the DMZ into North Korea. Some tourist activities at the final stop are bus and walking tours to the Dorasan Peace Park, the Third Tunnel, and the Dora Observatory.

The second route opened on August 1, 2014, and travels  on the Gyeongwon Line northeast from Seoul Station to Baengmagoji station, in Cheorwon County, Gangwon-do. It is the last station currently open on that line, followed by the now closed Woljeong-ri station in the DMZ, where visitors may tour, and Wonsan station, now located in North Korea, where trains used to arrive from Seoul in the early 20th century, but stopped after Korea's division. Some other off-train tour visits are White Horse Hill and Cheorwon Peace Observatory.
 

The train has three themed cars: "Peace Car" with a rusty steam train motif symbolizing the separation of the Korean peninsula, "Harmony Car", with paintings of red and blue figurines holding hands, and "Love Car" with paintings of adults and children from across the globe, also, holding hands. Inside the cars, ceilings are covered with pinwheels, and walls display photographs of the DMZ, with themes of war, trains, and ecology.

Reception
Soon after the opening of the first route to Dorasan station, on June 11, 2014, Song In-geol of The Hankyoreh reported ridership of around 10,000 for the first month, and the trip's significance, "...for South Koreans who moved here from the North, it is the road home, as well as memory lane; for young people and families, it is a way to experience the separation of the peninsula; for visitors from overseas, it is a journey motivated by curiosity".

In July 2017, BBC News journalist Steve Evans called it "one of the most bizarre train journeys in the world", and said, "It is a political journey, it is designed to make the point that the train goes and can go no further".

Operations
Western - Gyeongui Line
Started running: May 4, 2014
Stations: Seoul Station - Munsan station - Uncheon station - Imjingang station -  Dorasan station.
Approximate one-way travel time: 1 hour, 20 minutes.

Eastern - Gyeongwon Line
Started running: August 1, 2014
Stations: Seoul Station - Cheongnyangni station - Uijeongbu station - Dongducheon station - Soyosan station - Yeoncheon station - Sintan-ri station - Baengmagoji station.
Approximate one-way travel time: 2 hours.

Suspension 
On April 1, 2019, the eastern service was suspended due to construction of the new double tracked & electrified alignment of the Gyeongwon Line between Dongducheon station and Yeoncheon station. The eastern service is expected to resume when construction on the line is completed.

On October 2, 2019, the western service was suspended due to concerns about an outbreak of African swine fever, as requested by Paju City. It is unknown when the western service will resume.

References

External links

DMZ Train at Korail

Passenger trains of the Korail
Tourist trains in South Korea